NGC 233 is an elliptical galaxy located in the constellation Andromeda. It was discovered on September 11, 1784 by William Herschel.

References

External links
 

0233
Elliptical galaxies
Andromeda (constellation)
002604